Deh Shams-e Kuchak (also Romanized as Deh Shams-e Kūchak) is a village in Oshnavieh-ye Jonubi Rural District, Nalus District, Oshnavieh County, West Azerbaijan Province, Iran. At the 2006 census, its population was 253, in 42 families.

References 

Populated places in Oshnavieh County